Famous people in healthcare are famous for many different reasons. For physicians see: List of physicians.

Nurses

England
 Florence Nightingale OM, RRC — A celebrated English nurse, writer and statistician.

United States
Mary Martha Reid — Florida's "most famous nurse and Confederate heroine."

Respiratory therapists

Canada
 Susan O'Connor — A Canadian curler from Alberta.

United States
 Tom Araya — Respiratory therapist famous through his band Slayer.
 Efren Saldivar — Murdered 60+ people while working in Brownsville, Texas as a respiratory therapist.
 Ronald G. Beckett — Famous for advancing science in Mummy Science.
 Mary Ann Vecchio — The subject of a Pulitzer Prize-winning photograph by photojournalism student John Filo in the aftermath of the Kent State shootings on May 4, 1970.

References

Respiratory therapy